St Peter's Church, Riccarton is an Anglican church in Christchurch, New Zealand. It is registered as Category II by Heritage New Zealand.

History 
The Parish of Riccarton was formed in 1855 when the Parish of Christchurch was subdivided. The graveyard in the ground's of St Peter's was used for burials before a church was constructed on the site. The first church on the site of St Peter's was a wooden church designed by Benjamin Mountfort. The current stone church was built over 40 years in different stages. The first stone addition was the chancel. The chancel was built in 1876 and it was also designed by Mountfort. In 1900 the transepts, additions to the nave and an organ chamber were added, again to the design of Mountfort. In 1928 the final part of the original wooden church was replaced with a new west end and a stone tower both designed by Cecil Wood.

Canterbury earthquakes and restoration 
The church sustained damage during the September 2010 Christchurch earthquake and also in the February 2011 Christchurch earthquake. The architectural firm Tennent Brown were engaged to restore and restrengthen St Peter's. The church was restored and strengthened up to 100% of the national building standard. The restored church was reopened in February 2021.

Burials
George Ross (1829–1876), farmer and local politician
Sibella Ross (1840–1929), schoolteacher and businesswoman

References

External links 

 Church website

Churches in Christchurch
Heritage New Zealand Category 2 historic places in Canterbury, New Zealand
2011 Christchurch earthquake
Listed churches in New Zealand
1850s architecture in New Zealand
Stone churches in New Zealand